China Creek may refer to:

China Creek (Wilbarger County, Texas), a stream in Texas
China Creek (Columbia River), a stream in Washington